The Elgon Cup is contested between the rugby union teams of Kenya and Uganda. The men's and women's teams of these countries each compete annually for their respective cups on a Home-and-Away basis.  The competition and the cups are named after Mount Elgon, a mountain on the border of the two countries.

The men's competition started in 2004 while the women's Elgon Cup followed it a few years later, starting in 2006.  The Elgon cup has now been subsumed into the recently instituted Victoria Cup; just as the Bledisloe Cup (Australia and New Zealand), Freedom Cup (New Zealand and South Africa) and Mandela Challenge Plate (Australia and South Africa) have been subsumed into the Tri Nations and as the Calcutta Cup (England and Scotland) is now part of the Six Nations.

Home matches for Kenya are usually played at the RFUEA Ground, Nairobi, Kenya, whilst Uganda usually play their home matches at the Kyadondo Grounds, Kampala, Uganda.  The women's games generally serve as a curtain raiser to the men's games.

History

Earliest encounters

Kenya and Uganda have a long history of rugby matches going back even before the first official match in 1958.  Prior to the formation of the Rugby Football Union of Kenya (RFUK) in 1921 and the Uganda Rugby Football Union (URFU) in 1955, these two territories put out representative sides though, without a governing union, they could not award caps. Games were frequently played in the early days by representative sides from Kenya and Uganda (and also Tanganyika) against each other and against touring sides most notably from Royal Naval vessels and British and South African Universities (the University of Stellenbosch, University of Cape Town, Rhodes University and the Universities of Oxford and Cambridge).

The very first match between Kenya and Uganda involved an incident that may well be unique in international rugby history.  In the early 1930s there was only one rugby club in Uganda (the Uganda RFC, later to become "Uganda Kobs RFC" and then "Kampala Kobs RFC") and a number of Ugandan players (including Percy Minns) persuaded the Kenya clubs to send a Kenya XV to play against them in Entebbe.  Unfortunately, both teams arrived with a set of white jerseys.  According to long established tradition in rugby, it is the duty of the home side to change shirts in the event of a clash; about 10 miles from the clubhouse in Kampala, Uganda resorted to dying their shirts in the water-bucket on the sideline using the iodine from the medical kit.  The shirts were worn wet and, according to contemporary reports, the spectators and referee had greater and greater difficulty telling the sides apart as the game progressed.  Rugby is a game rooted deeply in tradition and, as a result of this incident, Ugandan representative sides wore black shirts for almost 100 years in memory of this incident. It is only recently that they have started wearing shirts that include red and orange, the other two colours present in the Ugandan flag, though the predominant colour still tends to be black.

The first official matches
The three African Great Lakes countries of Kenya, Tanzania and Uganda have a long shared history of rugby. For much of their history, they have relied on each other for club, inter-district, inter-territorial and international matches, as well as combining their resources to create a regional squad. This has all been aided by their membership in the Rugby Football Union of East Africa (RFUEA), an umbrella union for the three nations both before and after they each achieved independence in the early 1960s. Until independence, each was regarded as a colonial possession of the British Empire rather than an independent nation.

The first interterritorial match for Kenya took place in 1954 at Arusha against Tanganyika (as Tanzania was known at the time).  It was held shortly before the First Tuskers Copperbelt tour later that year and served as a selection trial for the tour.  This match was won by Kenya though the exact score is not known.  This fixture was repeated in 1955 and 1956.  With the URFU having recently been formed, it was decided to attempt a three-way competition in 1957; Uganda were to travel play Tanganyika in Arusha and Kenya were to visit Uganda in Kampala.  Uganda, who were chiefly responsible for the initiative, fulfilled their commitment though the score or winner is not known.  Kenya were unable to travel to play Uganda as organised due to commitments raised by the Combined Oxford and Cambridge Universities tour that year.

The first official match between Uganda and Kenya took place in 1958, when Kenya (then Kenya Colony) travelled to play Uganda (then Uganda Protectorate) in Kampala. Kenya beat Uganda by three goals and two tries to one goal, one penalty goal and one try. In 1958, a try was worth three points, so the final score was 11 – 21.

Post Colonial Rugby

Kenya's relatively smooth transition to independence and trouble free ensuing years under President Jomo Kenyatta saw rugby continue to thrive in this country.  Despite the fact that Idi Amin was a keen rugby player himself, the expulsion of expatriates from - and the general political instability in - Uganda under his reign disrupted the playing of domestic and international fixtures in Uganda.  As a result, Kenya have generally had the upper-hand in this East African derby.  However, in recent years the success of the Kenya 7's team has had a negative effect on the 15-a-side game as resources and focus has shifted toward the shortened version of the game.  This and the recent resurgence in the Ugandan rugby club scene has seen the balance of power shift westwards.

Victoria Cup
The most recent innovation has been the Victoria Cup.  This is slated to be an annual three-way  competition between Kenya, Uganda and Zimbabwe played on a home-and-away basis.  Rather than duplicate the fixture it has been decided that the pre-existing Elgon Cup games between Kenya and Uganda will take place within this new tournament.  The Victoria Cup was first played in June and July 2010.

Matches between Kenya and Uganda with Elgon Cup winners 
Results for men's and women's international rugby matches played between Kenya and Uganda are presented in the table below.

Notes

a.  The RFUK was dissolved in 1953 with the formation of the Rugby Football Union of East Africa (RFUEA); the current Kenya Rugby Football Union (KRFU) was not formed until 1970.

References

External links
 Report on 2007 Elgon Cup
  Report on women's 2008 Elgon Cup first leg

Rugby union competitions in Africa for national teams
International rugby union competitions hosted by Uganda
International rugby union competitions hosted by Kenya
Kenya national rugby union team
Uganda national rugby union team
2004 establishments in Kenya
2004 establishments in Uganda
Rugby union international rivalry trophies
Rugby union competitions in East Africa